Francisco de Assis França (March 13, 1966 – February 2, 1997), better known as Chico Science, was a Brazilian singer and composer and one of the founders of the manguebeat cultural movement. He died in a car accident in 1997 in Recife, Pernambuco, at the age of 30.

Biography
Francisco de Assis França was born in the Rio Doce neighbourhood of Olinda, Pernambuco, in Brazil's Northeast Region. As a little boy he would sell crabs that he caught himself in the city's mangrove swamps.

He became the lead singer and major creative driving force of the groundbreaking Mangue Bit band called Chico Science & Nação Zumbi (CSNZ). Influenced by such musicians as James Brown, Grandmaster Flash and Kurtis Blow, their music cleverly fused rock, funk, and hip hop with maracatu and other traditional rhythms of Brazil's Northeast. World music critics found his music "original and distinctive of his region." Chico had a powerful stage presence that was compared by some to that of Jimi Hendrix.

Around 1991, Chico Science, along with singer Fred 04 of the band Mundo Livre S/A, founded the Mangue Bit cultural movement in response to dire economic and cultural stagnation in Recife and Olinda. CSNZ made their US debut at New York's Central Park Summerstage in 1995, opening for Gilberto Gil, with whom he collaborated during the encore.  While in NY, they also performed additional shows at CBGB's, SOB's and at Bryant Park as part of the JVC Jazz Festival, on a bill with the Ohio Players.

Chico Science & Nação Zumbi toured several times in Europe and brought massive attention to the new generation of Brazilian artists in the 1990s. With only two full albums released during his lifetime, 'Da Lama Ao Caos' ('From Mud To Chaos) and 'Afrociberdelia', his influence and vision became the foundation to a whole new generation of musicians in Brazil. At the time of his death, The New York Times said he was "widely hailed as the future of Brazilian music." The Governor of the Brazilian state of Pernambuco declared three days of mourning.

In 1996, Chico Science contributed Maracatu Atômico along with Nação Zumbi to the AIDS-Benefit Album Red Hot + Rio produced by the Red Hot Organization. Nação Zumbi have continued to record and tour internationally after Chico's death.

Death 
Chico Science died in a car accident on February 2, 1997. He lost control of his Fiat Uno and hit a side light post after another car cut him off. He was rescued alive but he did not survive his injuries. He was buried on February 3 in Cemitério de Santo Amaro located in Recife. 10 years after his death, his family was compensated by Fiat due to a failure in the seatbelt that could have saved his life.

Legacy
In 2008, Rolling Stone Brasil ranked Chico Science as the 16th greatest Brazilian artist in their list of the 100 greatest artists of all time in Brazilian music

Discography
1994: Da lama ao caos
1996: Afrociberdelia
1998: CSNZ (posthumous)

References

Sneed, P. M. (2019). The Coexistentialism of Chico Science and Brazil's Manguebeat. Latin American Research Review, 54(3), 651–664. DOI: http://doi.org/10.25222/larr.451

External links

Channel Chico Science
Memorial Chico Science

1966 births
1997 deaths
Brazilian rock musicians
People from Pernambuco
Road incident deaths in Brazil
20th-century Brazilian male singers
20th-century Brazilian singers